Mute Witness is a 1995 horror film written, directed, and produced by Anthony Waller, and starring Alec Guinness, Marina Zudina, and Fay Ripley. Its plot follows a mute American makeup artist working on a slasher film in Moscow, who is pursued by a crime organization making and dealing snuff films after she stumbles upon one of their film sets and witnesses a murder.

The film was shot on location in Moscow, while Alec Guinness's scenes were filmed in Germany.

Plot 
Billy Hughes, a special effects make-up artist who is mute, is in Moscow working on a low-budget slasher film directed by Andy Clarke, the boyfriend of her elder sister, Karen. On one particular night, Billy returns to the set to fetch a piece of equipment for the next day's shoot when she is accidentally locked in the studio. Billy phones Karen for help and communicates with her via morse code, but is interrupted when she discovers a small film crew working after-hours to shoot a cheap pornographic film. Watching unseen, Billy is amused until the performed sex becomes sadistic. When Arkadi, the masked actor, pulls out a knife and brutally stabs the actress to death, Billy reacts and is discovered. She flees through the studio, pursued by the film's director, Lyosha, before crashing through a window outside. Moments later, Karen arrives and finds the injured Billy, with Lyosha standing over her. Lyosha pretends to be an innocent bystander who witnessed Billy's accident, but Karen senses he is dangerous based on Billy's body language.

Police arrive and question Lyosha, but come to the conclusion that Billy witnessed an elaborate special effects sequence being shot when they are unable to find a body. Arkadi, the man whom Billy witnessed stab the actress, demonstrates the effects using a fake knife that streams blood, frightening Andy when he pretends to attack him with it. Billy insists the prop knife is hers, and that Arkadi stole it. Billy leads police to an elevator shaft where she believes Lyosha stashed the actress's corpse, but they find it empty. After police dismiss the incident and send Billy home, a night watchman at the studio finds the actress's corpse burning in a basement incinerator before being stabbed to death by Arkadi. Shortly after, a mysterious elderly man arrives at the studio in a vintage car, and asks Lyosha if things "went smoothly." Aware that Billy witnessed the murder, the Reaper makes clear that she must be eliminated.

Meanwhile, a detective, Aleksander Larsen, begins looking into Billy's claim, believing there to be some truth to it, as rumors have circulated about an international crime ring making and selling snuff films in Moscow. The operation is led by a wealthy financier known as "the Reaper." Back at her apartment, Billy communicates with Karen using a digital phone dictation machine. In the midst of her conversation, Billy's doorbell rings, and she is confronted by Arkadi, who breaks in, followed by Lyosha. A violent struggle ensues, during which Billy manages to electrocute Arkadi in the bathtub with a hairdryer. Lyosha subsequently incapacitates Billy, only to be saved by Larsen, who beats Lyosha unconscious.

Larsen quickly escorts Billy away, and explains that the crime ring have targeted her, believing she is in possession of a computer disc containing confidential information. Meanwhile, Karen and Alex arrive at Billy's apartment only to find it disheveled, and they are subsequently attacked by Lyosha, who awakens. Two of the Reaper's thugs posing as policemen arrive at the scene, and they shoot and kill Lyosha before questioning Karen and Alex about the computer disc. Meanwhile, Billy directs Larsen to the film studio, where she believes the computer disc is located.

Karen and Andy meanwhile also rush to the studio, where Andy attempts to shoot at Larsen as he arrives with Billy, believing Larsen means her harm. In the melee, Billy rushes outside only to be confronted by numerous armed thugs, along with the Reaper. Moments later, Larsen shoots Billy multiple times, apparently killing her, before proffering the Reaper the sought-after computer disc. The Reaper and his thugs promptly depart, after which Karen begins to violently beat Larsen for killing her sister. However, Karen quickly realizes that Billy is still alive as she opens her eyes and brandishes a bulletproof vest; Larsen orchestrated the fake murder to divert the Reaper and spare Billy's life. Larsen makes plans to meet Billy the following day, and brings with him one of the studio's corrupt security guards, whom he has bound and gagged. As they are about to drive away, Billy observes the guard's worried expression, and realizes the car has been fixed with a bomb. With Alex's help, she manages to communicate this, and Larsen escapes the vehicle seconds before it explodes, saving himself.

Cast

Production

Anthony Waller filmed Sir Alec Guinness' scenes nearly a decade before the rest of the movie. When Waller needed an additional scene, he used the same footage but reversed it. Waller had  a chance encounter with the actor in Hamburg in 1985 and asked him if he was interested in doing a one-scene cameo. Guinness took no payment, doing it out of the "goodness of his heart", as the director recalled. The movie ended up being one of his final screen roles.

Release

Box office
Mute Witness was released theatrically in the United States on 15 September 1995, and earned $560,048 in its opening weekend in 284 theaters. It had an overall worldwide gross of $1,125,910.

Critical response

Its consensus reads, "Mute Witness is a slickly crafted horror/thriller with some surprising comic twists."

Roger Ebert praised the film, awarding it three out of four stars and comparing it favorably to Halloween (1978) and Blood Simple (1984).

Variety gave the film a mostly positive review, remarking that while the movie can be "entirely plot-driven, neglecting to develop intriguing characterizations", its "suspense is so chilling, its narrative so disciplined and its style so pleasurable, they jointly triumph over the other deficiencies." The review from the New Yorker was more mixed and they wrote that the director's "technique is impressive; the film falls flat only when he attempts to make the frightening funny. But the plot takes some nice twists and turns, the tension builds a good head of steam, and the tawdriness never lets up."

References

External links 
 
 
 

1995 films
1995 horror films
1995 independent films
1995 multilingual films
1990s horror thriller films
British independent films
British horror thriller films
British multilingual films
German horror thriller films
German independent films
English-language German films
German multilingual films
Russian independent films
English-language Russian films
Russian horror thriller films
Russian multilingual films
Films about film directors and producers
Films about filmmaking
Films directed by Anthony Waller
Films shot in Moscow
Films shot in Germany
Films about snuff films
Sony Pictures Classics films
1990s British films
1990s German films